The Aurora mine is the largest integrated phosphate mining and chemical plant in the world. The mine is located in Richland Township, in Aurora in Beaufort County, North Carolina. The mine which is owned since 1995 by PotashCorp, the world's largest potash producer and the second and third largest producer of nitrogen and phosphate, has an annual production capacity of over six million tonnes of phosphate ore. In 2008 the mine produced 6.6 million tonnes of phosphate ore from which 1.3 million tonnes of phosphoric acid was produced.

History
The phosphates of the Aurora mine are the result of a recession experienced by the sea coast of Aurora. Phosphates were deposited into the sea about 15 million years ago. PotashCorp bought the Aurora mine in 1995 from the Texas Gulf Sulphur Company as its first phosphate operation, and purchased the agricultural chemicals division of Occidental Chemicals six months later. In 2018, PotashCorp merged with Agrium, another Canadian company, to form Nutrien Ltd, current owner of the mine.

As of 2005 the Aurora mine had estimated proven and probable reserves of approximately 356 million tonnes of phosphate rock at an average grade of 30.7% P2O5. In 2009 the mine produced 4.2 million tonnes of phosphate rock and 0.93 million tonnes of phosphoric acid and had a number of 1,093 employees. In June 2009, PotashCorp received permission from the US Army Corps of Engineers to mine reserves within the extraterritorial jurisdiction boundaries for a period of 30 years.

The phosphate rock is transported by waterway to the deep water port of Morehead City, and a  railroad links the mining complex to the Norfolk Southern Railway and CSX Transportation rail networks.

See also
Phosphate mining in the United States

References

External links
Official website

Buildings and structures in Beaufort County, North Carolina
Phosphate mines in the United States
Mines in North Carolina